The Southern Rocky Mountain Front is a megaregion of the United States, otherwise known as a megalopolis, with population centers consisting mainly of the Front Range Urban Corridor and the Albuquerque–Santa Fe–Las Vegas combined statistical area, located along the eastern and southern face of the Southern Rocky Mountains in the U.S. states of Wyoming, Colorado, and New Mexico. The region comprises the southern portion of the Rocky Mountain Front geographic region of Canada and the United States, extending into the Southwestern United States. The Southern Rocky Mountain Front had a population of 5,467,633 according to the 2010 United States census. The region is one of the fastest-growing regions in the United States, and its population is projected to grow by 87% to 10,222,370 by 2050. In 2005 the GDP of the region was $229,202,000,000 making up 2% of the United States GDP.

Extent
The Southern Rocky Mountain Front stretches from Albuquerque, New Mexico, north along Interstate Highway 25 to Cheyenne, Wyoming, and includes the Denver-Aurora-Lakewood, CO Metropolitan Statistical Area, the Colorado Springs, CO Metropolitan Statistical Area, the Boulder, CO Metropolitan Statistical Area, the Fort Collins, CO Metropolitan Statistical Area, the Greeley, CO Metropolitan Statistical Area, the Pueblo, CO Metropolitan Statistical Area, the Cheyenne, WY Metropolitan Statistical Area, the Cañon City, CO Micropolitan Statistical Area, the Albuquerque, NM Metropolitan Statistical Area, and the Santa Fe, NM Metropolitan Statistical Area.  The region comprises three primary subregions: the South Central Colorado Urban Area, the North Central Colorado Urban Area, and the Cheyenne Metropolitan Area.

The influence of the region extends well beyond its defined boundaries.  The Colorado Eastern Plains, Nebraska Panhandle and Albany County, Wyoming, among other areas, are culturally and economically tied to the region, though they are not considered a part of it.

Transportation

Rail

The region was established, along with ten other megaregions throughout the United States, by America 2050 in response to President Barack Obama’s efforts to improve the country’s infrastructure. The megaregions were initially identified by America 2050 as areas that should have highspeed rail by 2050. According to America 2050’s four phase plan the Front Range would have highspeed rail on Phase 3 of the plan and the line would stretch from Denver, Colorado to Albuquerque, New Mexico.

Interstates and highways

Interstate 25 runs through the Southern Rocky Mountain Front north from Albuquerque, NM to Cheyenne, WY. Major east and west routes running through the region are I-40 through Albuquerque,  I-70 through Denver, and I-80 through Cheyenne. 
  Interstate 25 runs north–south from New Mexico through Denver to Wyoming
  Interstate 70 runs east–west through the region from Utah to Maryland
  Interstate 80 runs east–west through the region from California to New Jersey
  Interstate 40 runs east–west through the region from California to North Carolina

Airports

The region has seven airports offering passenger services with two of the airports, Albuquerque International Sunport and Denver International Airport, able to handle international flights.

List of airports offering passenger services

Municipalities

See also

Southern Rocky Mountain Front
Front Range Urban Corridor
Southeast Wyoming
North Central Colorado Urban Area
South Central Colorado Urban Area
Northern New Mexico
Colorado
Colorado statistical areas
Conurbation
List of census-designated places in Colorado
List of census-designated places in New Mexico
List of census-designated places in Wyoming
List of cities and towns in Colorado
List of cities and towns in New Mexico
List of cities and towns in Wyoming
List of counties in Colorado
List of counties in New Mexico
List of counties in Wyoming
List of places in Colorado
Megaregions of the United States
New Mexico
New Mexico statistical areas
Rocky Mountain Front
Southern Rocky Mountains
Statistical area (United States)
Combined statistical area (list)
Core-based statistical area (list)
Metropolitan statistical area (list)
Micropolitan statistical area (list)
Wyoming
Wyoming statistical areas

References

External links

United States Census Bureau

Megapolitan areas of the United States
Metropolitan areas of Colorado
Metropolitan areas of New Mexico
Metropolitan areas of Wyoming
Regions of the United States